Omid Ahangar (Persian: امید آهنگر) is an Iranian actor and film director. He is mostly known for his role as "Ali Kouchlou" (Ali the Little) in the 1983 animation for children under the same title.

Omid Ahangar was born on 25 September 1978 in Tehran. He studied literature of drama at Azad University of Arak.

Filmography

Director 
 TAVAN (2010)
 Entezar (2011) 
 JUST A WISH (2012) 
 Last Station (2013)
 Safe House (2014)
 Painting (2015)
 Swamp (2015)

Behtarin baba-ye donya (1991) 
 Ali va ghool-e jangal (1990)
 Harim-e mehrvarzi (1984)
 Tohfeha (1984)
 Sharayete eyny (1985)
 Raze cheshmeye sorkh (1992)
 gobare marg (1985)
 Ali Kocholo (1982)
 Eyd Didany (1981)
 Baftehaye ranj (acor)
 Bache mardom (1981)
 ASlahe chobi (1984) 
 Gole yas (1985)
 Hamsayeha (1986)
 Medad pakkon
 Do Morghabi Dar Meh
 Khatereh ha
 Gaz
 Etefagh
 Zire gonbade kabod
 Shab Cheragh
 Mah O Khorshid
 Hampeyman
 Topoli
 Cheshm cheshm do abro
 Aziz khanom
 Majara
 KHastegary Por Majara
 Rozhaye akhar
 Aks daste jami
 Zawiye
 Tope gerd
 Khaneye mehr
 Paeez laleha
 Mosafere zaman
 Dayere tardid
 Fasle zard
 Ahoye Mahe nohom
 Razo NIaz
 Panjomin Nafar
 Vapasin Koch
 Sere Eshgh
 Botimar
 Ayeneh
 Aftabe Sard
 Game Akhar
 Hozor
 Golestane jang
 Eynam ye Joreshe
 Khat shekan
 Dehkhoda
 Sisakht
 Shibe Tond
 Shabe Sarbaz
 Khate Barik
 Daftar Dar
 Tolo
 Dena
 Ta Hozor
 Bazgasht
 Neshani

References

External links 
 Interview with Omid Ahangar, 2005 (IRIB)
 Persian Star is in Netherlands as an asylum seeker
 Jomhouriat Interview with Omid Ahangar (in Persian)

1978 births
Male actors from Tehran
Iranian male television actors
Iranian male film actors
Living people